Emerson Run is a tributary of Lake Run in Lackawanna County, Pennsylvania, in the United States. Wild trout naturally reproduce in the stream. The surficial geology in its vicinity consists of Wisconsinan Ice-Contact Stratified Drift, Wisconsinan Till, bedrock, wetlands, peat bogs, and sand and gravel pits.

Course
Emerson Run begins in a wetland in a broad and shallow valley in Covington Township. It flows east for several hundred feet before turning north for a similar distance. The stream then turns northwest for a few tenths of a mile before turning east and crossing Pennsylvania Route 435. Several tenths of a mile further downstream, it turns north for a short distance before turning east. After a short distance, it reaches its confluence with Lake Run.

Geography and geology

The path of a planned utility line crosses Emerson Run.

The surficial geology in the vicinity of the lower reaches of Emerson Run consists mainly of Wisconsinan Ice-Contact Stratified Drift. Slightly further from the stream is an area of a glacial till known as Wisconsinan Till and an area of bedrock consisting of conglomeratic sandstone, sandstone, and shale. There are also a few patches of sand and gravel pits. Along the stream's upper reaches, the surficial geology mainly consists of Wisconsinan Till. However, there are also patches of Wisconsinan Ice-Contact Stratified Drift and pits of sand and gravel. Additionally, there is a patch of wetlands and peat bogs near this reach of the stream.

Watershed
The stream's mouth is in the United States Geological Survey quadrangle of Sterling. However, its source is in the quadrangle of Moscow.

History
Lake Run was entered into the Geographic Names Information System on August 2, 1979. Its identifier in the Geographic Names Information System is 1174218.

In the early 2000s, the Lackawanna River Watershed Conservation Plan recommended that Covington Township include protection of Emerson Run in its zoning plans.

Biology
Wild trout naturally reproduce in a reach of Emerson Run, as far downstream as the stream's mouth. The stream is designated as a High-Quality Coldwater Fishery.

See also
List of rivers of Pennsylvania
List of tributaries of the Lackawanna River

References

Rivers of Lackawanna County, Pennsylvania
Tributaries of Roaring Brook (Lackawanna River)
Rivers of Pennsylvania